Rustlers' Valley is a 1937 American Western film directed by Nate Watt and written by Harry O. Hoyt. The film stars William Boyd, George "Gabby" Hayes, Russell Hayden, Morris Ankrum, Muriel Evans and Lee J. Cobb. The film was released on July 23, 1937, by Paramount Pictures.

Plot

Reception

Cast 
 William Boyd as Hopalong Cassidy
 George "Gabby" Hayes as Windy Halliday 
 Russell Hayden as Lucky Jenkins
 Morris Ankrum as Glen Randall 
 Muriel Evans as Agnes Randall
 Lee J. Cobb as Cal Howard (billed as Lee Colt)
 Ted Adams as Henchman Taggart
 Al Ferguson as Joe, Howard Henchman
 John Beach as Sheriff Boulton
 John St. Polis as Banker Crawford

References

External links 
 
 
 
 

1937 films
1937 Western (genre) films
American Western (genre) films
American black-and-white films
Hopalong Cassidy films
Paramount Pictures films
Films directed by Nate Watt
1930s English-language films
1930s American films